Patrick Joseph Hackett (born 9 June 1954), is a British Labour politician and former Leader of Wirral Council.

He was elected leader of the Labour group on Wirral Council on 5 May, becoming Leader of the Council at the annual meeting on 14 May leading a minority Labour administration.

Electoral performance

References

|-

|-

|

1954 births
Living people
Members of Wirral Council
Labour Party (UK) councillors
Leaders of local authorities of England